Novosvitlivka (Novosvetlovka) is an urban-type settlement in Luhansk Raion, Luhansk Oblast in Eastern Ukraine. The settlement is on the main Luhansk–Krasnodon highway. Population: , .

War in Donbas

Since 2014, Krasnodon Raion has been controlled by forces of the Luhansk People's Republic.

The town is strategically positioned such that the Ukrainian ATO (Anti-Terrorist Operations) forces occupied it on August 15, 2014, to try to stop the humanitarian aid convoy from Russia to arrive to the people of South-Eastern Ukraine.

The convoy managed to arrive at the destination however the battle between ATO and separatist forces continued. The ATO forces used civilian buildings for their defense of the town which provoked separatist shelling of their positions. The photos show weapons burned by the separatist bombardment.

On August 19, The coordinator of the Information Resistance group, Dmytro Tymchuk, wrote that
"The ATO [anti-terrorist operation] forces (airmobile and mechanized units) continue defensive fighting near the settlements of Novosvitlivka and Khriashchuvate. The district has been blocked with 23 checkpoints and 29 strongholds".

On August 21, journalist Vsevolod Filimonenko wrote that 
"Fighters of the battalion «Aidar», which controls the village, had to leave their position so the terrorists would stop the shelling of the church. Later «Aidar» returned the full control over this settlement".

The battle continued over the town when, according to the Ukrainian government, "Russian" tanks of the separatist forces destroyed much of the town on August 30, including most residences.

The Ukrainian governmental forces were defeated in the battle to control the town.
"After weeks of yielding ground, the Russian-backed separatists are brimming with confidence following a string of seemingly effortless victories. On Saturday (August 30), Ukraine announced it was abandoning Ilovaisk, a city 25 kilometers (15 miles) north of Starobesheve. Surrounded on all sides over several days, they sustained fire so intense that the government was compelled to plead for a corridor out. "We are surrendering this city," said Ukrainian Col. Andriy Lysenko, a spokesman for the National Security and Defense Council of Ukraine. "Our task now is to evacuate our military with the least possible losses in order to regroup."
Lysenko said that regular units of the military had also been ordered to retreat from Novosvitlivka and Khryashchuvate, two towns on the main road between the Russian border and Luhansk, the second-largest rebel-held city. Ukraine had claimed control of Novosvitlivka earlier in August."

Demographics
According to the 2001 census, the population of the settlement was 3610. 54.43% reported that their native language was Ukrainian, whilst 45.10% said that it was Russian.

Gallery

References

Urban-type settlements in Luhansk Raion
Krasnodon Raion
Destroyed towns